César Adrián Lamanna (born 7 January 1987) is an Argentine football centre forward.

External links 
 

1987 births
Living people
Argentine people of Italian descent
Argentine footballers
Chacarita Juniors footballers
Club Atlético Colegiales (Argentina) players
Estudiantes de Buenos Aires footballers
San Lorenzo de Almagro footballers
Club Atlético San Miguel footballers
Argentine Primera División players
Association football forwards
Sportspeople from Buenos Aires Province